Brachytronidae is a family of dragonflies occurring in Australia, 
which until recently was considered to be part of the Aeshnidae family.

Genera
The family includes the following genus:

 Dendroaeschna

Notes
The family Brachytronidae is not currently recognised in the World Odonata List at the Slater Museum of Natural History.

References

Odonata families
Odonata of Australia
Endemic fauna of Australia